Acipenserid herpesvirus 2 (AciHV-2) is a virus in the genus Ictalurivirus, family Alloherpesviridae, and order Herpesvirales. It infects sturgeon of the family: Acipenseridae.

References

External links

Alloherpesviridae